Reis may refer to :

Reis (surname), a Portuguese and German surname
Reis (military rank), an Ottoman military rank and obscure Lebanese/Syrian noble title

Currency
Portuguese Indian rupia (subdivided into réis), the currency of Portuguese India until 1958
Portuguese real (plural reis or réis), the former currency of Portugal

People
Reis (footballer, born 1988), Deivdy Reis Marques do Nascimento, Brazilian football forward
Reis (footballer, born 1993), Isnairo Reis Silva Morais, Brazilian football midfielder

Places
Reis Township, Polk County, Minnesota, U.S.A.
Dirce Reis, São Paulo, Brazil
Angra dos Reis,  Rio de Janeiro, Brazil
Reis Magos, former name of Nova Almeida, Espírito Santo, Brazil
Reis Magos (river), a river at whose mouth the town of Nova Almeida stands
Caldas de Reis, Spain
Reis Magos, Goa, India

Other uses
Reis (film), a biography film from 2017 about the President of Turkey, Recep Tayyip Erdoğan
Hakan Ayik, also known as Hakan Reis, a Turkish-Australian criminal

See also

 Rhys (surname)
 
Imperial, royal and noble ranks
 Reece (disambiguation)
 Reese (disambiguation)
 Rees (disambiguation)
 Rhees (disambiguation)